The Power of the Dog is a 2021 revisionist Western psychological drama film written and directed by Jane Campion. It is based on Thomas Savage's 1967 novel of the same title. The film stars Benedict Cumberbatch, Kirsten Dunst, Jesse Plemons, and Kodi Smit-McPhee. Set in Montana and shot mostly within rural Otago, the film is an international co-production among New Zealand, the United Kingdom, Canada, and Australia.

The Power of the Dog had its world premiere at the 78th Venice International Film Festival on September 2, 2021, where Campion won the Silver Lion for Best Direction. The film had a limited theatrical release in November 2021, and was released to stream worldwide on Netflix on December 1, 2021. The Power of the Dog received universal acclaim from critics, who praised Campion's direction and screenplay, cinematography, score, and performances of the four leads.

It was highly regarded as one of the best films of 2021 by multiple top-ten lists and has received many accolades, including a leading 12 nominations at the 94th Academy Awards, among them Best Picture, Best Actor for Cumberbatch, Best Supporting Actor for both Plemons and Smit-McPhee, and Best Supporting Actress for Dunst. Campion won for Best Director, making the film the first to win only in that category since The Graduate (1967), and the latest film to lose in a record ten categories after The Irishman (2019). It was named one of the best films of 2021 by the American Film Institute, and received seven nominations at the 79th Golden Globe Awards, winning Best Motion Picture – Drama, Best Supporting Actor – Motion Picture for Smit-McPhee, Best Director for Campion. It received ten nominations at the 27th Critics' Choice Awards, winning four, including Best Picture and received eight British Academy Film Awards, winning Best Direction and Best Film.

Plot
In 1925 Montana, wealthy ranch-owning brothers Phil and George Burbank meet widow and inn owner Rose Gordon during a cattle drive. The kind-hearted George is quickly taken with Rose, but the coarse and volatile Phil dislikes her, believing she only wants George's money. Phil also belittles her teenage son Peter, whom he derides as weak and effeminate. George and Rose marry and she moves into the Burbank ranch house while Peter attends medical school. George organizes a dinner party with his parents and the governor and pressures Rose into a piano recital. George reveals that Phil was a brilliant student at Yale, in contrast to his rough nature. Rose is unable to perform due to Phil's earlier belittlement. Humiliated and upset by Phil's behavior, Rose starts drinking, becoming an alcoholic by the time Peter arrives home for a break from school. Phil and his men taunt Peter and he isolates himself in his room, where he dissects a rabbit he has caught.

In a glade away from the mansion, Phil masturbates with a delicate scarf belonging to his late mentor, Bronco Henry. Peter enters a bivouac in the glade and finds a stash of Bronco Henry's homoerotic magazines depicting nude men. He observes Phil bathing in a pond with Bronco's scarf around his neck before Phil chases him away. Later, in front of his men, Rose and George, Phil makes amends with Peter, offering to plait him a lasso from rawhide before he returns to school. He teaches him to ride a horse. Peter heads out on his own one day, finds a dead cow and, after carefully putting on rubber surgeon's gloves he brought in his backpack, cuts off pieces of the cow's hide. Phil and Peter ride into the hills together. While trying to catch a rabbit hiding in a pile of wood posts, Phil gashes his hand, but declines Peter's offer to dress the wound. Peter tells Phil about finding the body of his alcoholic father, who had hanged himself, and having the strength to cut him down.
 
Rose's alcoholism worsens as Peter and Phil spend more time together. Upon learning about Phil's policy of burning unwanted hides, Rose defiantly gives them to local Native American itinerant traders, and collapses on her way back to the house. Upon discovering this, Phil is infuriated. George says she is unwell. Peter pacifies Phil by offering him strips from the hide that he had cut, omitting mention of the hide's origin. Phil is touched by Peter's gesture and holds him close to his face. The pair spend the night in the barn finishing the rope. Blood flows from Phil's open wound as he swirls the hide in the solution used to soften it. Peter asks Phil about his relationship with Bronco Henry, with Phil saying that he had once saved his life when they were caught in a freezing storm in the mountains by keeping him warm with his body. Peter asks if they were naked, but Phil does not answer. They later share a cigarette.

The following morning, George finds Phil sick in bed, his wound now severely infected. A delirious Phil looks for Peter to give him the finished lasso, but George takes him to the doctor. George is later seen picking out a coffin for his brother while his body is prepared for burial. At the funeral, the doctor tells George that Phil most likely died of anthrax. This puzzles George, as Phil was always careful to avoid diseased cattle. Peter, who skipped Phil's funeral, opens a Book of Common Prayer to a passage on burial rites and then reads Psalm 22: "Deliver my soul from the sword; my darling from the power of the dog." With carefully gloved hands, Peter stows his finished lasso under his bed. As Peter watches George and a now-sober Rose return home and embrace, he turns away and smiles, implying he intentionally gave Phil the diseased hide to save his mother's life.

Cast

Production

Background
In early 2017, writer-director Jane Campion, having just finished filming the second season of Top of the Lake, received a copy of Thomas Savage's 1967 novel The Power of the Dog from her stepmother, Judith. Campion was enthralled by the book and began hunting for its film rights. She and producer Tanya Seghatchian eventually obtained the rights from Canadian producer Roger Frappier after meeting with him at the 2017 Cannes Film Festival. According to Campion, the novel had been optioned at least five times prior but never made. Paul Newman was among those who had tried to adapt the book.

While working on the script, Campion maintained correspondence with author Annie Proulx, who wrote the afterword to a 2001 edition of Savage's novel. After completing her first draft, Campion visited Savage's ranch in Montana, met with members of his family (the author had died in 2003) and consulted with an expert on Savage from the University of Montana Western in Dillon. Campion was unable to film in Montana due to budget concerns, and opted to shoot in her native New Zealand instead. Cinematographer Ari Wegner and production designer Grant Major eventually discovered an ideal location in Central Otago in New Zealand's South Island, months before the film's early 2020 start date.

Development and casting
It was announced in May 2019 that Campion was to write and direct the film with Benedict Cumberbatch and Elisabeth Moss cast to star. Paul Dano entered negotiations to join the film in September. He was confirmed to star the next month, with Kirsten Dunst cast to replace Moss in her role. However, by November, Dano also dropped out due to scheduling conflicts with The Batman. Jesse Plemons, who was originally offered the role before Dano, was cast to replace him. In February 2020, Thomasin McKenzie, Kodi Smit-McPhee, Frances Conroy, Keith Carradine, Peter Carroll, and Adam Beach were confirmed to be cast in the film.

Campion had Cumberbatch in mind for the role of Phil Burbank. He first caught Campion's attention in the 2012–2013 BBC drama Parade's End. To prepare for the role, Cumberbatch did research into the Lewis and Clark Expedition and worked for a time on a cattle ranch near Glacier National Park in Montana. He attended a three-week boot camp to learn horse-riding, rope-throwing, castrating bulls and playing the banjo.

Filming
Filming began in New Zealand in January 2020 in the Maniototo in Central Otago, and also took place in the coastal Otago city of Dunedin and the town of Oamaru. Production on the film was halted in March 2020 due to the COVID-19 pandemic. After border exemptions were granted for cast and crew, production resumed in June 2020. All of the film's interior scenes were shot on sound stages in Auckland during the final weeks of filming. Principal photography concluded in July 2020. Throughout the production Cumberbatch stayed in character; he and Dunst agreed not to speak on set.

Cinematography
Director of photography Ari Wegner shot The Power of the Dog using two Arri Alexa LF cameras paired with Panavision Ultra Panatar anamorphic lenses, with a 2.40:1 aspect ratio. Campion was specifically looking for a female cinematographer who would be willing to embark on a full year of preparations alongside her. She sought out Wegner, who had shot a 2015 ANZ ad campaign with Campion. Wegner and Campion did meticulous storyboarding for the film, sometimes separately so that the two could compare later. Wegner drew extensively on the work of Evelyn Cameron, an English photographer who moved to Montana near the turn of the 20th century. Period photographs from the Time magazine archives, Ken Burns' documentary series The West and the works of artists Andrew Wyeth and Lucian Freud were additional points of reference.

Set design
Grant Major was responsible for The Power of the Dog'''s production design; he had previously worked with Campion on her film An Angel at My Table. Against difficult weather conditions, Major and his team built the façade of the two-story mansion, a working barn, a cattle pen and stockyards on location in time for the start of the shoot. The interiors of the mansion, built later on a sound stage in Auckland, were modeled after Theodore Roosevelt's Sagamore Hill. Period-correct furniture was not readily available in New Zealand and as a result, set decorator Amber Richards sourced most of the objects from various prop houses in Los Angeles.

Music

Campion recruited Jonny Greenwood to compose the score for The Power of the Dog. Greenwood wanted to avoid the "sweeping strings" typical of Westerns, opting instead to use atonal brass sounds in order to emphasize the "alien, forbidding" nature of the film's landscapes. He was not satisfied with the sound of Phil's banjo on screen and, as an alternative, took to play the cello like a banjo on his own, using the same fingerpicking technique. The resulting sound, according to Greenwood, was "a nice confusion" and "a sound you recognize, but it's not a style that you’re familiar with." As a result of the COVID-19 pandemic and the gathering restrictions in place, Greenwood was unable to work with an orchestra and had to record many of the cello parts on his own, layering them to achieve an orchestral texture.

ReleaseThe Power of the Dog had its world premiere at the 78th Venice International Film Festival on September 2, 2021, and had Special Presentation screenings at the 2021 Toronto International Film Festival and Telluride Film Festival that same month. By the end of its run, the film screened at film festivals in Charlottesville, London, Middleburg, Mill Valley, Montclair, New York (centerpiece screening), San Diego, San Sebastian, Savannah, and Zurich. The film also played at the 52nd International Film Festival of India in November.

The film had a limited theatrical release in Australia and New Zealand commencing on November 11, 2021, with theatrical distribution in both countries handled by Transmission Films. The film's limited theatrical release in the United States and the United Kingdom began on November 17, before it was released on Netflix worldwide on December 1, 2021. A behind-the-scenes documentary called Behind the Scenes with Jane Campion was also later released on Netflix worldwide on January 27, 2022. Between promotion and awards campaigns, Netflix spent around $50 million on the film.

The Criterion Collection released the film on DVD and Blu-ray on November 8, 2022.

Reception
 Box office 
Although Netflix does not report box office grosses of its films, IndieWire estimated the film made $125,000 from 40 theaters in its opening weekend, and a total of $160,000 over its first five days.

 Audience viewership 
Over its first five days of digital release it was streamed by 1.2 million U.S. households, 92,000 UK households, 37,000 German households, and 16,000 Australian. By March 20 the film had been streamed in 3.4 million households in the United States, including 717,000 since the Oscar nomination announcements on February 8.

Critical response
On review aggregator website Rotten Tomatoes, the film has an approval rating of 94% based on 351 reviews, with an average rating of 8.4/10. The site's critics consensus reads, "Brought to life by a stellar ensemble led by Benedict Cumberbatch, The Power of the Dog reaffirms writer-director Jane Campion as one of her generation's finest filmmakers." According to Metacritic, which assigned a weighted average score of 89 out of 100 based on 58 critics, the film received "universal acclaim".

Reviewing the film for The Hollywood Reporter, David Rooney wrote, "This is an exquisitely crafted film, its unhurried rhythms continually shifting as plangent notes of melancholy, solitude, torment, jealousy and resentment surface. Campion is in full control of her material, digging deep into the turbulent inner life of each of her characters with unerring subtlety." Conversely, Owen Gleiberman of Variety wrote, "All of this should build, slowly and inexorably, in force and emotion. But for a film that's actually, at heart, rather tidy and old-fashioned in its triangular gamesmanship, The Power of the Dog needed to get to a more bruising catharsis. In its crucial last act, the film becomes too oblique."

Metacritic reported that The Power of the Dog appeared on over 118 film critics' top-ten lists for 2021, the most of any film that year. The film ranked first on 31 lists and second on 23 lists.

 Accolades The Power of the Dog became the first film directed by a woman to receive more than ten Academy Award nominations, and Campion became the first woman to receive more than one Academy Award nomination for Best Director, her first being for The Piano. The film became the first since Becket'' (1964) to win only one award from twelve nominations.

References

External links

 
 
 Official screenplay

2021 films
2021 drama films
2021 LGBT-related films
2020s English-language films
2020s psychological drama films
Best Drama Picture Golden Globe winners
Best Film BAFTA Award winners
Films based on American novels
Films featuring a Best Supporting Actor Golden Globe winning performance
Films whose director won the Best Director Golden Globe
Films set in 1925
Films set in Montana
Films shot in New Zealand
Films directed by Jane Campion
Films scored by Jonny Greenwood
Films about anti-LGBT sentiment
Gay-related films
LGBT-related drama films
Film productions suspended due to the COVID-19 pandemic
Films set in the 1920s
Films about mother–son relationships
Films about brothers
Films about cattle
American Western (genre) films
New Zealand Western (genre) films
Films whose director won the Best Directing Academy Award
2021 Western (genre) films
New Zealand LGBT-related films